Claude and Starck was an architectural firm in Madison, Wisconsin, at the turn of the twentieth century. The firm was a partnership of Louis W. Claude (1868-1951) and Edward F. Starck (1868-1947). Established in 1896, the firm dissolved in 1928. The firm designed over 175 buildings in Madison.

Madison buildings 

 Alpha Phi Chapter House Association Sorority House (1905) bluelines 
 Alpha Tau Omega Chapter House "Gamma Tau of Alpha Omega"
 American Tobacco Company Warehouses Complex (1901, the west building, on the National Register of Historic Places since 2003)
 Breese Stevens Field (1925-26)
 Castle & Doyle storefront, State Street
 Bascom B. Clarke House (1899, on the National Register of Historic Places since 1980)
 Claude House (1899; on the National Register of Historic Places since 1980)
 Cornelius Collins House, 646 E Gorham St, 1908
 William Collins House (ca. 1911; on the National Register of Historic Places since 1974)
 Doty School
 Edward C. Elliott House (1910, on the National Register of Historic Places since 1978)
 Fay House
 Gary House
 Edward A. Ross House (1907; on the National Register of Historic Places since 1982)
 Charles Heyl House, 952-956 Spaight St., 1906.
 Hirsig House (on the National Register of Historic Places since 1974)
 Hokanson House
 Jackman Building (1913-14; on the National Register of Historic Places since 1980)
 Adolph H. Kayser House (1902; on the National Register of Historic Places since 1980)
 Lamb Building (1905; on the National Register of Historic Places since 1984)
 August Cornelius Larson House (1911; on the National Register of Historic Places since 1994)
 Lincoln School (1915; on the National Register of Historic Places since 1980)
 George A. Lougee House (1907; on the National Register of Historic Places since 1978)
 Luther Memorial Church  (1923; on the National Register of Historic Places since 2018)
 Madison Gas and Electric Company Powerhouse (ca. 1908; on the National Register of Historic Places since 2002)
 Majestic Theater
 Harlow & Isabel Ott House
 Phi Delta Theta chapter house
 Public Library Branch, Williamson Street
 Ralph Richardson House, 745 Jenifer St, 1908-09.
 Oscar & Mary Schubert house, 932 Spaight St, 1906.
 Aquatic Bird and Fish Aquarium at the Henry Vilas Zoo
 Wiedenbeck-Dobelin Warehouse (1907; on the National Register of Historic Places since 1986)
 Zimmerman Store and Apartment
 1028 Sherman Avenue
 1937 Arlington Place (1900)

Buildings elsewhere

Claude and Starck designed approximately 40 libraries, including the "seven sisters" characterized by the Prairie School style.
 Aitkin, Minnesota: Aitkin Carnegie Library, NRHP-listed
 Antigo, Wisconsin: Junior High School
 Argyle, Wisconsin: Argyle High and Grade School (1920)
 Baraboo, Wisconsin: Baraboo Public Library (1903)
 Barron, Wisconsin: public library (1913; one of the "seven sisters")
 Bloomington, Wisconsin: High and Grade School (1923)
 Darlington, Wisconsin: Darlington Carnegie Free Library (1905)
 Delavan, Wisconsin: Aram Public Library on Fourth Street (1907)
 Detroit Lakes, Minnesota: Carnegie Library (1913; listed since 1976 in the National Register of Historic Places)
 Evansville, Wisconsin: public library (1908; perhaps the first of the "seven sisters")
 Fennimore, Wisconsin: Dwight T. Parker Public Library (1923 NRHP-listed)
 Hoquiam, Washington: Carnegie Library (circa 1910; listed since 1982 in the National Register of Historic Places)
 Jefferson, Wisconsin: Jefferson Public Library (listed since 1980 in the National Register of Historic Places)
 Kaukauna, Wisconsin: public library (1905)
 Lancaster, Wisconsin: Municipal Building (1923; listed since 1983 on the NRHP)
 Ladysmith, Wisconsin: Carnegie Library (1907)
 Merrill, Wisconsin: T.B. Scott Free Library (1911; listed since 1974 in the National Register of Historic Places; one of the "seven sisters")
 Mineral Point, Wisconsin: Mineral Point Opera House and municipal building (1915)
 Monroe, Wisconsin: Arabut Ludlow Memorial Free Library (1904)
 Mount Horeb, Wisconsin: Henry L. and Sarah Dahle House (1916, listed on the NRHP since 2003)
 Owen, Wisconsin: Woodland Hotel (1906, for the J. S. Owen Lumber Company). Listed on the Wisconsin Register of Historic Places since 2015, and the National Register of Historic Places since 2016.
 Rochelle, Illinois: public library
 Rock Springs, Wisconsin: Ableman High and Grade School (1923)
 Shawano, Wisconsin: public library (1914; one of the "seven sisters"; now demolished)
 Tomah, Wisconsin: Tomah Public Library (1916; listed since 1976 in the National Register of Historic Places)
 Wilmette, Illinois: public library (1904)
 Wisconsin Dells, Wisconsin: Kilbourn Public Library (1912; listed since 1974 in the National Register of Historic Places)

References

External links
 Unheralded and underappreciated, these men may have been the most influential contributors to Madison's architecture: Behold…The Genius Of Claude And Starck, Madison Magazine
 Louis W. Claude papers, N114, University of Minnesota Libraries, Minneapolis, MN.
 Claude & Starck Libraries

Architecture firms based in Wisconsin
Companies based in Madison, Wisconsin